The four species of lion tamarins or maned marmosets make up the genus Leontopithecus. They are small New World monkeys named for the mane surrounding their face, similar to the mane of a lion.

Description
Living in the eastern rainforests of Brazil, like all other callitrichids they are arboreal. They jump through trees using their fingers to hold on to branches; they use their claws to dig under the bark to search for insects to eat. They also eat some snakes, small lizards, and small fruits. All are endangered or critically endangered, in part because their habitat has been severely disrupted by human development and climate change. 

Lion tamarins tend to live in family groups, with both parents sharing different tasks of rearing the yearly twins born to them. The mother nurses her young every two to three hours, and the father carries the babies on his back.

Diurnal tree-dwellers, they sleep in tree cavities at night. They also seek shelter during the hottest part of the day.

Species list
The different species of lion tamarins are easily discernible from each other, based upon the coloration of their fur:

Conservation 
Climate change has been affecting the lion tamarins in that cocoa production has taken over their habitat. Mass produced cocoa has been found to thin out surrounding canopy trees in the area. These trees are where lion tamarins mostly resign throughout the day.

See also
Tamarin, genus Saguinus

References

External links

 http://www.thewildones.org/Animals/tamarin.html
 Primate Info Net Leontopithecus Factsheets

 
^|tamarin
^|tamarin